The 2016–17 Austrian Hockey League season began on 15 September 2016 and ended on 7 April 2017. The defending champion was EC Red Bull Salzburg. On April 7, the Vienna Capitals won the Austrian Hockey Championship for the 2nd time in their history.

Teams

Standings

Regular season

Placement round

Qualification round

Playoffs

References

External links 

Erste Bank Eishockey Liga Statistics

Austrian Hockey League seasons
Aus
1
2016–17 in Slovenian ice hockey
2016–17 in Italian ice hockey
2016–17 in Hungarian ice hockey
2016–17 in Czech ice hockey